This is the list of notable people who were born, lived or grew up in Abbottabad.

Politicians 
 Ali Khan Jadoon
 Abdul Jamil Khan
 Azam Khan Swati
 Farooq Haider Khan
 Haider Zaman Khan
 Javed Iqbal Abbasi
 Muhammad Azhar Jadoon
 Mushtaq Ahmed Ghani
 Murtaza Javed Abbasi
 Nazir Ahmed Abbasi
 Raja Sikander Zaman
 Sabrina Singh

Sports

Cricket 
 Yasir Hameed
 Mohammad Naeem
 Fawad Ahmed
 Fawad Khan (cricketer)
 Junaid Khan (cricketer)

Media and Entertainment 
 Afzal Khan (actor)
 Manoj Kumar
 Nimmi

Abbottabad District
People from Abbottabad District